Lake Manchester  is both a lake in the City of Brisbane and the surrounding locality which is split between the City of Brisbane and Somerset Region in Queensland, Australia.

Geography

The locality is mostly undeveloped mountainous terrain of the south west D'Aguilar Range.  The north of the suburb is part of the D'Aguilar National Park and most of the southern parts belong to the Brisbane State Forest.

The western part of the locality in Somerset Region is rural land, predominantly use for grazing on native vegetation.

History

The locality is named after the lake which was created by the Lake Manchester Dam constructed between 1912 and 1916. It is named after civil engineer, Ernest James Theodore Manchester, who was the President of the Metropolitan Water and Sewerage Board from 1909 to 1928.

Education 
There are no schools in Lake Manchester. The nearest government primary school is Mount Crosby State School in Mount Crosby to the south. The nearest government secondary school is Ipswich State High School in Brassall, Ipswich, to the south.

References

Suburbs of the City of Brisbane
Suburbs of Somerset Region
Localities in Queensland